Irene Becker (born 1952) is a German nurse, and serial killer, who killed at least 5 people by administering them drugs while working at the Charité clinic. In the media, she was given nicknames like the Angel of Death from Charité and Sister Death.

Becker, who was considered a dutiful nurse, had previously worked as a nurse in an intensive care unit for 35 years.

Her deeds were discovered after a fellow nurse found a discarded ampoule in the hospital garbage, subsequently informing the management of her suspicions about the exceptionally high death rate in the ward.

Becker was sentenced on June 29, 2007 by the Landgericht Berlin for murder in five out of eight cases, and given life imprisonment. The court considered that the murderous trait of the other base motives was fulfillment and considered that the nurse became obsessed with power while murdering the patients.

On appeal from the defense, the Federal Court of Justice changed the guilty verdict to triple homicide and two counts of manslaughter, but that did not change the sentence.

A particular severity of guilt was not established. Thus, the remainder of the sentence can be suspended after serving out 15 years (counting from her arrest in October 2006), i.e. from late 2021 onwards.

See also
 List of German serial killers

References 

1952 births
21st-century German criminals
21st-century German women
Charité
German female serial killers
German nurses
German women nurses
Living people
Medical serial killers
People convicted of murder by Germany
Poisoners
Prisoners and detainees of Germany